Ibanking may refer to:

Investment banking
Islamic banking

See also
 ibank (disambiguation)